Lois Jade Roche (born 18 June 1993) is a footballer who plays as a midfielder for Charlton Athletic of FA Women's Championship, the second level of women's league football in England.

Roche was born and brought up in England but chose to play for the Republic of Ireland at youth international level.

For many years player for Reading, in 2017 she took the opportunity to play in a foreign league for the first time, joining Finnish Naisten Liiga club Åland United.

At the end of the championship she decided to move to Italy, to play for Florentia, a team at the top of the Serie B table, in the second part of their 2017–18 season. In September 2020 she made her debut in Norway for Røa IL.

References

External links
 
 FA Ireland player profile 
 Reading player profile 
 

Living people
1993 births
Republic of Ireland women's association footballers
Republic of Ireland women's youth international footballers
Women's association football midfielders
Women's Super League players
Reading F.C. Women players
Åland United players
Kansallinen Liiga players
Florentia San Gimignano S.S.D. players
Serie A (women's football) players
Røa IL players
Toppserien players
Irish expatriate association footballers
Irish expatriate sportspeople in Finland
Expatriate women's footballers in Finland
Irish expatriate sportspeople in Italy
Expatriate women's footballers in Italy
Irish expatriate sportspeople in Norway
Expatriate women's footballers in Norway
Charlton Athletic W.F.C. players
Women's Championship (England) players